The 1930 Iowa State Senate elections took place as part of the biennial 1930 United States elections. Iowa voters elected state senators in 21 of the state senate's 50 districts. State senators serve four-year terms in the Iowa State Senate.

A statewide map of the 50 state Senate districts in the 1930 elections is provided by the Iowa General Assembly here.

The primary election on June 2, 1930 determined which candidates appeared on the November 4, 1930 general election ballot.

Following the previous election, Republicans had control of the Iowa state Senate with 48 seats to Democrats' 2 seats.

To claim control of the chamber from Republicans, the Democrats needed to net 24 Senate seats.

Republicans maintained control of the Iowa State Senate following the 1930 general election with the balance of power shifting to Republicans holding 44 seats and Democrats having 6 seats (a net gain of 4 seats for Democrats).

Summary of Results
Note: The 29 holdover Senators not up for re-election are not listed on this table.

Source:

Detailed Results
NOTE: The 29 districts that did not hold elections in 1930 are not listed here.

Note: If a district does not list a primary, then that district did not have a competitive primary (i.e., there may have only been one candidate file for that district).

District 1

District 7
Though Coykendall won the general election running as a Democrat, he switched parties to Republican as he was sworn into the Iowa State Senate.

District 9

District 10

District 12

District 13

District 18

District 20

District 21

District 22

District 29

District 30

District 34

District 35

District 37

District 38

District 42

District 44

District 45

District 48

District 50

See also
 United States elections, 1930
 United States House of Representatives elections in Iowa, 1930
 Elections in Iowa

References

1930 Iowa elections
Iowa Senate
Iowa Senate elections